Kye Sun-hui (born August 2, 1979, in Pyongyang) is a North Korean judoka.

Kye won three Olympic medals in different weight classes, in 1996, 2000 and 2004. When she won the gold medal in Atlanta, 1996 she became the youngest gold medalist in judo. She had entered the Games thanks to the wild card system, and her Olympic gold has been described as one of the biggest surprises of the Atlanta Olympics.

Kye competed for a fourth time at the 2008 Summer Olympics in Beijing but did not fare too well.

She has been awarded the Kim Il-sung Prize and the titles of People's Athlete and Labor Hero.

References

External links
 
 
 
 

1979 births
Living people
Sportspeople from Pyongyang
North Korean female judoka
Judoka at the 1996 Summer Olympics
Judoka at the 2000 Summer Olympics
Judoka at the 2004 Summer Olympics
Judoka at the 2008 Summer Olympics
Olympic judoka of North Korea
Olympic gold medalists for North Korea
Olympic silver medalists for North Korea
Olympic bronze medalists for North Korea
Olympic medalists in judo
Medalists at the 1996 Summer Olympics
Medalists at the 2000 Summer Olympics
Medalists at the 2004 Summer Olympics
Asian Games medalists in judo
Judoka at the 1998 Asian Games
Judoka at the 2002 Asian Games
People's Athletes
Asian Games gold medalists for North Korea
Asian Games bronze medalists for North Korea
Medalists at the 1998 Asian Games
Medalists at the 2002 Asian Games
Suan Gye clan
21st-century North Korean women